Lewis Seymour Deane (12 March 1882 – 18 December 1934) was an Anglo-Indian tennis player.

Born in Meerut, Deane was the second son of British Indian Army captain George Deane of the Bengal Lancers.

Deane, a champion of Bengal and Punjab, played in India's first ever Davis Cup team in 1921, with the side going through to the semi-finals. He twice reached the Wimbledon men's doubles semi-finals (with Sydney Jacob in 1921 & Hassan Ali Fyzee in 1923) and was a mixed doubles finalist at the 1923 Wimbledon Championships.

Grand Slam finals

Mixed doubles: 1 (1 runner-up)

See also
List of India Davis Cup team representatives

References

External links
 
 
 

1882 births
1934 deaths
Indian male tennis players
Sportspeople from Meerut
British people in colonial India